A fish finger sandwich is a sandwich containing fish fingers, a battered or breaded fish. It is a popular dish in Britain where it is a comfort food. The sandwich often has no other filling, but may include a sauce such as tartare, mayonnaise or ketchup.

Celebrity chef Jamie Oliver has described the sandwich as a guilty pleasure: "As a chef I always feel I shouldn't be eating something like a fish finger buttie – but you know what, I think that makes it taste even better."

Restaurants which have included fish finger sandwiches in their menu include:  Bill's, Kerbisher & Malt and Leon.

In 2017, Birds Eye sponsored Fish Finger Sandwich Awards, whose final stage was held at Mark Hix's Tramshed restaurant.  There were separate prizes for the best professional and best entry from the public.  The judges were Gregg Wallace, Jennifer Bedloe, Xanthe Clay, Peter Lack and Danny Kingston, while Captain Birdseye looked on.  The winning professional was Chris Lanyon of the  Chapel Café in Port Isaac whose recipe included hake in panko with tartar sauce.  Gabrielle Sander made the best public entry, which was dressed with capers, lime juice, smoked paprika mayonnaise, rocket and wasabi, served in a crusty bap.

The earliest example of the fish finger sandwich being created is probably during early 1981 when a nursing assistant, Dean Bevan (then Wilkinson), at the old county psychiatric hospital of St Audry's in Melton, Suffolk found that he regularly had a lot of fish fingers left over following serving the patients breakfast. He discovered that although fish fingers were not particularly popular as a breakfast food, nevertheless, the kitchen served them each morning. So, rather than throw them away he decided to try them as a sandwich snack for his colleagues. Initially they simply consisted of four fish fingers between two slices of white bread along with a little tomato ketchup. They eventually proved popular with nursing staff and it seems quite likely that news of this simple, tasty snack spread by word of mouth and became popular throughout the UK.
Ref. D Bevan 1981

See also
Filet-O-Fish sandwich, invented in 1962 in the US

References

External links
 Birds Eye Fish Finger Sandwich Awards 2017

Fish dishes
Seafood sandwiches
British sandwiches